Mauricio Andre Dubón ( born July 19, 1994) is a Honduran professional baseball shortstop and center fielder for the Houston Astros of Major League Baseball (MLB).  The Boston Red Sox selected Dubón out of high school in the 26th round of the 2013 MLB draft.  He made his MLB debut with the Milwaukee Brewers in 2019, and has also played for the San Francisco Giants

Early life and high school career
Dubón was born and raised in San Pedro Sula, Honduras where he attended Liceo Bilingüe Centroamericano High School. When Dubón was 15 years old, a Christian mission group that was visiting Honduras saw Dubón play baseball and invited him to move to the United States to hone his baseball skills while attending high school. Dubón accepted the offer and moved to Sacramento, California where he enrolled at Capital Christian High School as a foreign exchange student. He posted a .509 batting average (86-for-169) after his junior and senior years at Capital Christian High School, including 23 doubles, 14 triples, eight home runs, and 81 RBIs before being drafted by Boston. He was ranked by Baseball America as the best defensive player among the 2013 Red Sox draft picks.

Professional career

Boston Red Sox
The Red Sox selected Dubón in the 26th round of the 2013 MLB draft. After batting .245 in 20 games for the GCL Red Sox shortly after signing, Dubón was promoted to the Lowell Spinners in 2014 and ranked among the top ten in the New York–Penn League with a .320 batting average (82-for-256).

For the Greenville Drive in 2015, Dubón hit .364 through his first 11 games and had hit safely in 10 of those contests. He finished the season with High-A Salem Red Sox of the Carolina League, hitting a combined .288/.349/.376 slash line with 30 stolen bases in 120 games during the two stints. He was an SAL mid-season All Star. He then was invited by the Boston Red Sox to participate in its 2016 spring training.

Dubón continued his development at Salem in 2016, earning a spot in the Carolina League All-Star team to play in the 2016 California-Carolina League All-Star Game. He was promoted to Double-A Portland Sea Dogs following his appearance in the All-Star Game. At the time of his promotion, Dubón had a .306/.387/.379 line over 238 at-bats with a good approach producing more walks (33) than strikeouts (25). The .306 average was good for third in the Carolina League, and the on-base percentage ranked sixth. Besides, his speed has also continued to be a huge part of his game, stealing 24 bases in 28 attempts, for the sixth best in the league.

At Double-A, Dubón improved his slash line to .339/.371/.538 over 62 games with Portland, including 23 multi-hits games, six home runs and 40 RBI. Overall, he hit .323/.379/.461 with 101 runs, 69 RBI and 30 stolen bases in the two stints. Besides, he led the Red Sox minors system in runs and hits (157), while his .323 average was the second-best to Aneury Tavárez (.330). In addition, he finished third in stolen bases behind Yoan Moncada (45) and Danny Mars (31) and sixth in RBIs. He was a Carolina League mid-season All Star. He then was selected to join the Surprise Saguaros of the Arizona Fall League during the postseason.

Milwaukee Brewers
On December 6, 2016, the Red Sox traded Dubón, Travis Shaw, and Josh Pennington to the Milwaukee Brewers in exchange for Tyler Thornburg. He spent 2017 with both the Biloxi Shuckers and the Colorado Springs Sky Sox, posting a combined .274 batting average with eight home runs, 57 RBIs and 38 stolen bases in 129 total games between both teams. He was a Southern League mid-season All Star. The Brewers added him to their 40-man roster after the season.

MLB.com ranked Dubón as Milwaukee's 11th-ranked prospect going into the 2018 season. He spent the 2018 season with the Colorado Springs Sky Sox, batting .343 with four home runs, 18 RBIs, and six stolen bases in only 27 games due to injury.

He played most of 2019 with the San Antonio Missions, batting .297/.333/.475 with 59 runs, 16 home runs, and 47 RBIs in 404 at bats.

On July 7, 2019, the Brewers promoted Dubón to the major leagues. He made his MLB debut that day against the Pittsburgh Pirates, grounding out as a pinch hitter; he had two major league at bats with the Brewers for the season. Dubón was the second Honduran baseball player to make it to MLB, after Gerald Young.

San Francisco Giants
On July 31, 2019, the Brewers traded Dubón to the San Francisco Giants in exchange for pitchers Ray Black and Drew Pomeranz. With the Sacramento River Cats, the AAA affiliate of the Giants, in 2019 he batted .323/.391/.485 with 23 runs, 4 home runs, and 9 RBIs in 99 at bats. Dubón started at second base for the Giants on August 29, getting his first Major League hit, with his California family in attendance. With the Giants in 2019, he batted .279/.312/.442 with 12 runs, 4 home runs, and 9 RBIs in 104 at bats. He played 22 games at second base, and 9 games at shortstop.

In 2020, he batted .274/.337/.389 for the Giants with 21 runs, 4 home runs, and 19 RBIs in 117 at bats in 54 games. He played 44 games in center field, 8 games at shortstop, and 8 games at second base.

In the 2021 regular season, with the Giants he batted .240/.278/.377 with 9 doubles, 5 home runs, and 22 RBIs in 175 at bats in 74 games. He played 27 games in center field, 21 games at shortstop, 20 games at second base, and 12 games at third base. With the River Cats, he batted .332/.410/.498 with 41 runs, 8 home runs, 31 RBIs, and 9 steals in 247 at bats.

Houston Astros
On May 14, 2022, Dubón was traded to the Houston Astros in exchange for catcher Michael Papierski.  Dubón is the second Honduran to play for the Astros; outfielder Gerald Young was the first.  

Dubón started at shortstop on June 19, 2022, and hit his first home run in an Astros uniform, in the seventh inning versus Chicago White Sox starter Michael Kopech as the Astros won, 4–3.  On August 21, Dubón batted leadoff and started at second base versus the Atlanta Braves, collecting two hits, a stolen base, and scoring two runs to catalyze a 5–4 Houston win.  Dubón started in center field on August 28 versus the Baltimore Orioles, collecting one single and two outfield assists, rifling out both Robinson Chirinos and Jorge Mateo at third base.

In 2022, Dubón batted .208/.254/.294 in 197 at bats.  On defense, he played 45 games in center field, 17 games at shortstop, 16 games at second base, nine games in  left field, and three games in right field.  He appeared in each of the Astros' series during the postseason for a total of six games.  In the World Series, the Astros defeated the Philadelphia Phillies in six games to give Dubón his first career World Series title. Dubón also became the first Honduran born player in Major League history to both play in and win a World Series.

On January 13, 2023, Dubón avoided arbitration with the Astros, agreeing to a one-year, $1.4 million contract for the season.

References

External links

1994 births
Living people
Biloxi Shuckers players
Colorado Springs Sky Sox players
Expatriate baseball players in the United States
Greenville Drive players
Gulf Coast Red Sox players
Honduran expatriate sportspeople in the United States
Houston Astros players
Lowell Spinners players
Major League Baseball players from Honduras
Major League Baseball shortstops
Milwaukee Brewers players
People from San Pedro Sula
Portland Sea Dogs players
Sacramento River Cats players
Salem Red Sox players
San Antonio Missions players
San Francisco Giants players
Surprise Saguaros players